Calverocheres is a genus of crustaceans belonging to the monotypic family Calverocheridae.

The species of this genus are found in Europe, Malesia.

Species:

Calverocheres engeli 
Calverocheres globosus 
Calverocheres oblongus

References

Siphonostomatoida